John Aikman Stewart (August 26, 1822 – December 18, 1926) was a New York City banker who during the administration of Grover Cleveland replenished the nation's gold supply by issuing new bonds. He was also the third person in its history to serve as acting President of Princeton University from 1910 to 1912. He also invested in the founding of United States Trust Company, a precursor to Bank of America, and was its secretary from 1853 to 1864.

Biography
Stewart was born on August 26, 1822. He graduated from Columbia College in 1840. During the presidency of Grover Cleveland he replenished the nation's gold supply by organizing a syndicate that bought $50,000,000 in bonds.  He died on December 18, 1926, and was the oldest surviving Columbia alumnus at that time.

References

1822 births
1926 deaths
American centenarians
American bankers
Columbia College (New York) alumni
Men centenarians
Presidents of Princeton University